Ards Forest Park is a park in County Donegal, Ireland.

History and Location 
The forest park is situated on the small Ards Peninsula. It sits on the shores of Sheephaven Bay on the northern coastline of County Donegal, Ireland. It's to be found on the N56 road, between Creeslough and Dunfanaghy. Ards Forest Park was formerly part of the Ards Estate, a country estate purchased by Alexander Stewart in the 1780s. The Ards Estate, centered on Ards House (demolished in the early 1960s), was owned by the Stewart family up until the early 1930s. The last member of the Stewart family to own the estate was Lady Ena Stewart-Bam, who inherited from her grandfather around 1904. She was the wife of Lt. Col. Sir Pieter C. van B. Stewart-Bam, Kt., O.B.E., a South African soldier, politician and businessman whom she married in 1910. The forest park is now owned by Coillte, a State body.

Sights and walks within the park 
Today, the forest park is 481 hectares in area and contains a range of wildlife and plants, as well as the remains of four ringforts and a number of megalithic tombs.  Legend has it that these tombs were the beds of Diarmuid and Gráinne in their flight from Fionn Mac Cumhaill.  

The forest park has many signposted walks integrating the main features of the park. These include the Ards Heritage Trail, which is around 3.5 km long, the Nature Trail and the Green Trail, which are both approximately 3 km long, and the Red Trail, which is 13 km long, though this walk does give provisions for a short-cut back to the starting point should it be needed.  There are various viewing points on the walks and trails with views of the surrounding countryside.

The Ards Heritage Trail passes a well called the Ague Well, which is alleged to be holy and have remedial powers, and a Mass rock where mass was celebrated in defiance of the Penal Laws. 

The forest park also has a picnic and children's play area and a snack outlet called the Ards Coffee Tree.

Nearby
Just outside the forest park, at Ballymore on its northern border, is Clondehorky Parish Church, a Church of Ireland church built in the Georgian style in the mid-18th-century. The small parish church overlooks the N56 road, being located between Creeslough and Port-na-Blagh. It may have been designed by Micheal Priestly. Directly opposite the church's main gate is Ballymore Arch, built for the Stewart family in the 19th-century to improve access from the church to Ards House, which was several miles distant at the edge of the small Ards Peninsula.

External links

 Official County Donegal Portal
 Creeslough Home Page
 Coillte

Parks in County Donegal
Forests and woodlands of the Republic of Ireland
Mass rocks